Major Kerby Farrell (September 3, 1913 – December 17, 1975) was an American professional baseball player, coach and manager. He was a longtime minor league manager who spent a single season — 1957 — managing in Major League Baseball for the Cleveland Indians. Farrell was a three-time winner of The Sporting News' Minor League Manager of the Year award (1954, 1956 and 1961) and is the only man to have won that award more than twice (as of 2015).

Playing career
Born in Leapwood, an unincorporated community of McNairy County, Tennessee, Farrell played college baseball at Freed-Hardeman College for two years. In his playing days (1932–52), he was a first baseman and veteran minor-leaguer who appeared in two full MLB seasons during the World War II manpower shortage, with the 1943 Boston Braves and the 1945 Chicago White Sox, batting .262 with 177 hits, no home runs and 55 runs batted in in 188 games played. He also pitched in five games for the 1943 Braves, losing his only decision and compiling an earned run average of 4.30 in 23 innings of work.

Managing career
Farrell began his managing career before the war in the Class C Middle Atlantic League in 1941–42. In 1947, he joined the farm system of the Cleveland Indians as skipper of the Spartanburg Peaches of the Class B Tri-State League and began a steady rise through the Cleveland organization. His 1953 Reading Indians of the Class A Eastern League won 101 games, while his 1954 and 1956 Indianapolis Indians, then Cleveland's Triple-A club, won American Association pennants and the 1956 Junior World Series. These triumphs earned Farrell his first two managerial awards.

At the close of the 1956 season, after his club had won 88 games and finished as runners-up to the New York Yankees, Cleveland Indians manager Al López resigned to become the new skipper of the White Sox and Farrell was promoted to succeed him. The 1957 campaign was a star-crossed season for the Indians. Prodigal left-handed pitcher Herb Score, a strikeout king and 20-game winner in 1956, was nearly blinded on May 7 by a line drive off the bat of the Yankees' Gil McDougald, and missed the rest of the campaign. Two other 20-game winners from '56, eventual Hall of Famers Bob Lemon and Early Wynn, slumped to below .500 records. The Indians fell to a 76–77 (.497) record and a sixth-place finish, the team changed general managers (from Hank Greenberg to Frank Lane), and Farrell was fired. 

He then returned to the minors, where he managed in the Philadelphia Phillies, New York Mets and Minnesota Twins organizations. He also coached for the White Sox (1966–69) and Indians (1970–71). As a minor league skipper over 21 seasons, Farrell won 1,710 games, losing 1,456 (.540).

Death
Kerby Farrell died from a heart attack in Nashville, Tennessee, at age 62.

References

Johnson, Lloyd, ed., The Minor League Register. Durham, North Carolina: Baseball America, 1994.
Marcin, Joe, ed., The Baseball Register. St. Louis: The Sporting News, 1970.

External links

SABR bio
TN HOF bio
Vanderbilt article

1913 births
1975 deaths
Baseball players from Tennessee
Beckley Black Knights players
Boston Braves players
Buffalo Bisons (minor league) managers
Canton Terriers players
Cedar Rapids Indians players
Chicago White Sox coaches
Chicago White Sox players
Cleveland Indians coaches
Cleveland Indians managers
Erie Sailors players
Greenville Bucks players
Indianapolis Indians managers
Indianapolis Indians players
Jackson Mississippians players
Little Rock Travelers players
Major League Baseball bench coaches
Major League Baseball first base coaches
Memphis Chickasaws players
Minnesota Twins scouts
People from McNairy County, Tennessee
Reading Indians players
Scranton Red Sox players
Spartanburg Peaches players
Tyler Governors players
Vicksburg Hill Billies players